Pajaritos, Bravos Muchachitos is the fourth album of the Argentinean musician Indio Solari among with his band "Los Fundamentalistas del Aire Acondicionado". The album includes the participation of "Semilla" Bucciarelli, Sergio Dawi and Walter Sidotti, old bandmates of Solari in Patricio Rey y sus Redonditos de Ricota, in the last song "La pajarita pechiblanca". Even though Solari had intended to work with them before, they had not shared a studio since the band separated in 2001.

Overview 
As usual in his post Patricio Rey albums, Solari appears on the credits under a pseudonym, this time it's El Fisgón Ciego.

Among with Solari are as well Gaspar Benegas and Baltasar Comotto playing guitar, Marcelo Torres bass guitar, Hernán Aramberri y Martín Carrizo in the drums, Sergio Colombo playing the saxophone, Miguel Ángel Tallarita in trumpets, Pablo Sbaraglia in keyboards and Alejandro Elijovich in violin. The album was produced and recorded at Luzbola, Solari's personal studio. Engineering and edition was done by Martín Carrizo and Hernán Aramberri.

Songlist 
All songs were written by Solari, except "La Pajarita Pechiblanca" written by Dawi, Bucciarelli, Sidotti and Solari.

Credits 
Musicians
Indio Solari – Lead vocals.
Gaspar Benegas – Rhythm guitar.
Baltasar Comotto – Lead guitar.
Marcelo Torres – Bass guitar.
Hernán Aramberri and Martín Carrizo – Drums.
Pablo Sbaraglia – Keyboards and samplers.
Miguel Ángel Tallarita – Brass.

Guests
Alejandro Elijovich – Violin.
Daniel "Semilla" Bucciarelli - Bass guitar on "La pajarita pechiblanca".
Walter Sidotti - Drums on "La pajarita pechiblanca".
Sergio Dawi - Accordion on "La pajarita pechiblanca".

References 

2013 albums
Indio Solari albums